Zyganisus caliginosus, the Australian goat moth, is a moth of the family Cossidae. It is found in Tasmania, Victoria and New South Wales.

References

External links
ento.csiro

Cossinae
Moths described in 1856